Michael J. Nolan (February 1, 1856 – December 24, 1902) was an American printer and politician from New York.

Life 
Nolan was born on February 1, 1856, in Albany, New York, the son of Patrick and Mary Nolan.

When he was 13, Nolan entered the printing office of Joel Munsell and began studying the printing trade. In 1877, he began working for the Argus Company as a compositor for the Argus. He was promoted to day foreman of the Argus compositing room in 1885, and then foreman of the book-room. In the latter position, he superintended the execution of the 1886 legislative printing. He was prominently involved with organized labor, belonging to the Albany Typographical Union. He was an organizer for the International Typographical Union, and he represented his union at two national conventions. He retired as a printer in 1893, and later became proprietor of a saloon.

In 1885, Nolan was elected town supervisor of the Albany 2nd Ward. He was re-elected the following year unopposed. In 1889, he was elected to the New York State Assembly as a Democrat, representing the Albany County 1st District. He served in the Assembly in 1890 and 1891.

Nolan was a member of the Elks. He had a wife, three daughters, and a son.

Nolan died on December 24, 1902.

References

External links 
 The Political Graveyard

1856 births
1902 deaths
19th-century American politicians
19th-century printers
American printers
County legislators in New York (state)
International Typographical Union people
Democratic Party members of the New York State Assembly
Politicians from Albany, New York
19th-century American businesspeople